This is a list of films which have placed number one at the weekend box office in Romania during 2023.

List

Highest-grossing films

References 

Romania